is a passenger railway station located in the town of Misaki, Sennan District, Osaka Prefecture, Japan, operated by the private railway operator Nankai Electric Railway. It has the station number "NK41-3".

Lines

Layout
The station consists of a single dead-headed island platform, of which only one side is in use.

Adjacent stations

History
Tanagawa Station opened on June 1, 1944.

Passenger statistics
In fiscal 2019, the station was used by an average of 602 passengers daily.

Surrounding area
 Misaki Municipal Cultural Center.

See also
 List of railway stations in Japan

References

External links

  

Railway stations in Japan opened in 1944
Railway stations in Osaka Prefecture
Misaki, Osaka